Enid Nemy (born 1924) was a reporter and columnist for The New York Times for many years. She began at the Times in 1963, and remained for four decades before retiring. She was awarded the 1984 Matrix Award "for achievement in newspapers and wire services".

After retirement, she continued to pen the occasional obituary for illustrious New Yorkers (e.g. Enid A. Haupt, Bill Blass, Eugene Lang, Lucille Lortel, Betsey Whitney, Patricia Buckley, Leona Helmsley, and Elaine Kaufman), and select others (Larry Hagman).

Biography
Enid Nemy was born in Winnipeg, Manitoba in 1924. She attended United College and the University of Manitoba. She began her career with The Canadian Press, later working with the Canadian Broadcasting Corporation as well as the Bermudan Mid-Ocean News.

Nemy reported from Southeast Asia and accompanied President and Mrs. Reagan in 1982 to the European Summit meeting, and in 1984 to China. She was editor of Metropolitan Diary, a weekly column of stories submitted by New York Times readers. She wrote for other magazines and periodicals, and was known in literary circles for her often biting quotes.

Her affiliations have included:
 Dorothy Strelsin Foundation, President
 Lighthouse International (former board member)
 New York Newspaper Women's Club, member
 New York Newspaper Guild, member
 Women in Communications, member
 American Theatre Wing, board of trustees

Marriage
Nemy was married to S. Ralph Cohen, a vice-president of the Scandinavian Airlines System, until his death in 1983. The union was childless.

Writing

Quotes
 "Even at the United Nations, where legend has it that the building was designed so that there could be no corner offices, the expanse of glass in individual offices is said to be a dead giveaway as to rank. Five windows are excellent, one window not so great." (Nemy)

References

1924 births
Living people
American columnists
American newspaper reporters and correspondents
The New York Times columnists
Canadian emigrants to the United States
Canadian columnists
Canadian women columnists
Canadian newspaper reporters and correspondents
Canadian women journalists
Journalists from Manitoba
Writers from Winnipeg
University of Manitoba alumni
Date of birth missing (living people)
American women columnists
Canadian women non-fiction writers
21st-century American women